Saxifraga mertensiana, the wood saxifrage or Mertens' saxifrage, is a species of plant in the Saxifragaceae family. It is native to western North America.

References

External links

Jepson Manual Treatment
Washington Burke Museum
Photo gallery

mertensiana